Tichit or Tichitt is a partly abandoned village at the foot of the Tagant Plateau in central southern Mauritania that is known for its vernacular architecture.  The main agriculture in Tichit is date farming, and the village is also home to a small museum.

Archaeological significance
This region includes a long sandstone cliff formation that defines the northern limit of the Hodh depression, near the former lake of Aoukar.

The medieval trading settlement at Tichit is now a UNESCO World Heritage Site.

The Neolithic site of Dhar Tichitt in this area was settled by agropastoral communities around 2000 BC. Their settlements were generally situated on the cliffs and included stone building. These are the oldest surviving archaeological settlements in West Africa and the oldest of all stone base settlements south of the Sahara. They are thought to have been built by the Soninke people and were possibly the precursor of the Ghana empire. The area was abandoned around 500 BC probably because of the onset of more arid conditions. Hundreds of rock art images have been discovered, depicting various animals and hunting scenes.  Archaeologists including P.J. Munson, Augustin F.C. Holl, and S. Amblard have found some evidence that millet was farmed seasonally as early as 2000 BC.

Climate

Notes

References
.
.
.

Further reading

External links 

Communes of Mauritania
World Heritage Sites in Mauritania
Prehistoric Africa
Archaeological sites in Mauritania